The initials BRN may refer to:
 Bahrain, IOC country code
 Barisan Revolusi Nasional, an independence movement in Thailand
 Berne Airport, Switzerland, IATA airport code
 Brunei, ISO 3-letter country code
 Bulk Richardson number, in meteorology
 Bunte Republik Neustadt, a  former micronation in Dresden, now a festival